The 3rd Special Operations Helicopter Regiment "Aldebaran" is an Italian Army regiment based at Viterbo Airport in Lazio. The regiment is part of the army aviation and assigned to the Army Aviation Command. The regiment supports unit the special forces and ranger regiments of the Army Special Forces Command.

History 
On 15 December 1993 the 3rd Army Aviation Regiment "Aldebaran" was formed at Bresso Airport near Milan by reorganizing the 3rd Army Corps' Light Aviation Command. The regiment consisted of a command, a command and services squadron, and the 53rd Squadrons Group "Cassiopea". Before the activation of the regiment the Cassiopeia had moved from Padua Airport to Bresso, where it incorporated personnel and materiel of the disbanded 23rd Squadrons Group "Eridano". On 15 February 1995 the regiment received its flag.

On 1 September 1998 the regiment was disbanded, while the 53rd Squadrons Group "Cassiopeia" moved from Bresso to Miramare Air Base, where the squadrons group joined the 5th Army Aviation Regiment "Rigel". Later that month the flag of the 3rd Army Aviation Regiment "Aldebaran" was transferred to the Shrine of the Flags in the Vittoriano in Rome.

Naming 
Since the 1975 army reform Italian army aviation units are named for celestial objects: regiments, are numbered with a single digit and named for stars in the 88 modern constellationss. Accordingly, an army aviation regiment's coat of arms highlights the name-giving star within its constellation. Squadron groups were numbered with two digits and named for constellations, or planets of the Solar System. The 3rd Army Aviation Regiment "Aldebaran" was named for Aldebaran the brightest star in the Taurus constellation.

Special Operations Helicopter Unit 
On 24 July 1964 the Light Aircraft Section was formed at Alghero–Fertilia Airport in Sardinia to support the Italian Armed Forces Special Units Grouping, which was tasked with guarding military intelligence installations and training the direct action personnel of the Italian military intelligence agency SISMI. In 1976 the section was expanded to the 399th Light Aircraft Squadron, and in November 1989 it was expanded to 39th Squadrons Group "Drago" and equipped with AB-412A helicopters.

During the 1975 army reform the Light Aviation Unit "Folgore" of the Paratroopers Brigade "Folgore" at Pisa-San Giusto Air Base was reorganized as 26th Squadrons Group "Giove". During the same reform the 1st Army Light Aviation Grouping "Antares" reorganized its I General Use Helicopters Unit as 51st Multirole Helicopters Squadrons Group "Leone".

In 1999 the 39th Squadrons Group "Drago" was disbanded and its personnel and materiel transferred to Viterbo Airport, where they were used to form the Medium Helicopters Squadron with AB-412A helicopters. On 1 September 2001 the 26th Squadrons Group "Giove" was transferred to the 1st Air Cavalry Regiment "Antares". On 4 November 2002 the 26th Squadrons Group "Giove", 51st Squadrons Group "Leone", and Medium Helicopters Squadron were merged and formed the 26th Air Cavalry Squadrons Group "Giove" - Special Operations Helicopters Unit ( - REOS).

The Giove consisted of a command, a logistic section, a maintenance squadron, and a helicopter squadron equipped with CH-47C Chinook and AB-412A helicopters, which were based at Viterbo Airport, and a detachment at Pisa-San Giusto Air Base with AB 205 helicopters.

On 9 November 2014 the Giove left the 1st Army Aviation Regiment "Antares" and on 10 November 2014 the 26th Army Aviation Unit "Giove" entered the newly formed 3rd Special Operations Helicopter Regiment "Aldebaran", which was assigned to the Army Aviation Brigade. On 19 November of the same year the regiment retrieved the flag of 3rd Army Aviation Regiment "Aldebaran" from the Shrine of the Flags in the Vittoriano. On 29 January 2015 the activation ceremony was held at Viterbo. On 31 December 2015 the detachment in Pisa was disbanded and the remaining AB 205 helicopters retired. On 31 July 2019 the regiment was transferred from the Army Aviation Brigade to the Army Aviation Command.

Current Structure 
As of 2022 the 3rd Special Operations Helicopter Regiment "Aldebaran" consists of:

  3rd Special Operations Helicopter Regiment "Aldebaran"", at Viterbo Airport
 26th Army Aviation Squadrons Group "Giove"
 261st Medium Transport Helicopters Squadron (CH-47F ER Chinook)
 262nd Combat Support Helicopters Squadron (AB-412A helicopters)
 263rd Tactical Transport Helicopters Squadron (NH90A helicopters)
 Support Squadrons Group
 Command and Logistic Support Squadron
 Aircraft Maintenance Squadron
 Special Forces/Special Operation Forces Crew Formation Center and Training Squadron
 Forward Operating Base at Pisa Air Base

Operational deployments 
The Aldebaran has been deployed repeatedly for international missions:

 Restore Hope, Somalia, 1992
 War in Afghanistan (2001–present), Afghanistan, 2001-2021
 Operation Ancient Babylon, Iraq, 2003–2004

Comparable Units 
 U.S.A: 160th Special Operations Aviation Regiment (Airborne)
 Australia: 171st Special Operations Aviation Squadron
 Canada: 427 Special Operations Aviation Squadron
 France: 4th Special Forces Helicopter Regiment 
 United Kingdom: Joint Special Forces Aviation Wing

References

External links 
 Italian Army Website: 3° Reggimento Elicotteri per Operazioni Speciali "Aldebaran"

Special forces of Italy
Helicopter units and formations
Army Aviation Regiments of Italy